Amorph may refer to:

 Amorph (gene), a type of mutated allele

See also 
 Amorphous solid
 Amorpha, a genus of plants in the pea family
 Amorpha juglandis, in the monotypic moth genus Amorpha
 Amorphae, a 2016 album by Ben Monder
 Amorphea, or unikonts, a taxonomic supergroup of eukaryotes
 Amorpheae, a monophyletic clade of the flowering plant subfamily Faboideae